Sérgio Rezende (born April 9, 1951) is a Brazilian filmmaker. He was born in Rio de Janeiro, and is best known for directing several biographical films, such as Lamarca, Mauá - O Imperador e o Rei, and Zuzu Angel, about guerrilla leader Carlos Lamarca, entrepreneur Irineu Evangelista de Sousa, and stylist Zuzu Angel Jones, who embarked on a frantic search for her son Stuart's body. His most recent release, Salve Geral, was submitted by the Ministry of Culture for consideration of the Academy of Motion Picture Arts and Sciences for the 82nd Best Foreign Language Film Oscar. It was not nominated for the award. His 1987 film The Man in the Black Cape was entered into the 15th Moscow International Film Festival.

Filmography
 2009 - Salve Geral
 2006 - Zuzu Angel
 2004 - Onde Anda Você
 2000 - Quase nada
 1999 - Mauá - O imperador e o rei
 1997 - Guerra de Canudos
 1994 - Lamarca
 1989 - Doida demais
 1987 - O homem da capa preta
 1982 - O sonho não acabou
 1980 - Até a última gota

References

External links

1951 births
Brazilian film directors
Living people
People from Rio de Janeiro (city)